

Major women's suffrage organizations

International

International Alliance of Women – founded in 1904 to promote women's suffrage.
Woman's Christian Temperance Union – active in the suffrage movement, especially in the U.S. and New Zealand.

Australia
 Victorian Women's Suffrage Society, founded in 1884, the local suffrage organisation of Victoria and the first suffrage organisation in Australia

Belgium
Ligue belge du droit des femmes (Belgian League for the Rights of Women), founded 1892, concerned with voting rights from 1912.

Britain

National Society for Women's Suffrage – Britain's first large suffrage organization, founded in 1867 by Lydia Becker.
Women's Franchise League – major British group created in 1889 by Emmeline Pankhurst.
Women's Freedom League – British group founded in 1907 by 70 members of the Women's Social and Political Union in a breakaway following rules changes by Christabel Pankhurst.

Bulgaria

Bulgarian Women's Union (Bulgarskiat Zhenski Suyut) –  Bulgarian organization from 1901 to 1944.

Canada

Canadian Women's Suffrage Association – founded 1877, name changed in 1883 to Toronto Women's Suffrage Association.

Denmark
Danish Women's Society (Dansk Kvindesamfund), founded 1871.
Kvindelig Fremskridtsforening (Women's Progress Association), 1885–1893.
Kvindevalgretsforeningen (Women's Suffrage Association), 1889–1898.
Landsforbundet for Kvinders Valgret (National Association for Women's Suffrage), 1907–1915.

Finland
Suomen Naisyhdistys or Finsk kvinnoförening (Finnish Women's Organization), founded 1884.

France
Fédération Française des Sociétés Féministes (French Federation of Feminist Societies), 1891–1893.
French Union for Women's Suffrage (Union française pour le suffrage des femmes), 1909–1940.
Ligue Française pour le Droit des Femmes (French League for Women's Rights), 1882–1950s.

Germany
Deutscher Verband für Frauenstimmrecht (German Union for Women's Suffrage), 1902–1919.

Greece
Greek League for Women's Rights ( Σύνδεσμος για τα Δικαιώματα της Γυναίκας), founded 1920.

Hungary
Feministák Egyesülete (Feminist Association), 1904–1942.

Iceland
Icelandic Women's Rights Association (Kvenréttindafélag Íslands), founded 1907.

Ireland

Dublin Women's Suffrage Association – major Irish organization.
Irish Women's Franchise League – founded in 1908, more radical than the Dublin Association.
Irish Women's Suffrage Society – founded by Isabella Tod as the North of Ireland Women's Suffrage Society in 1872, it was based in Belfast but had branches in other parts of the north.
Women's National Health Association – founded in 1907 to combat tuberculosis and infant mortality.

Lithuania
Lithuanian Women's Association (Lietuvos moterų susivienijimas), active 1905.

Netherlands
Vereeniging voor Vrouwenkiesrecht – Dutch organization from 1894 to 1919.
Nederlandsche Bond voor Vrouwenkiesrecht  – Dutch organization from 1907 to 1920.

Norway
Kvindestemmeretsforeningen (Women's Voting Rights Association), 1885–1913.
Norwegian Association for Women's Rights, Norsk Kvinnesaksforening, founded 1884.
National Association for Women's Suffrage (Landskvinnestemmerettsforeningen) – Norwegian organization from 1898 to 1913.

Poland
Polish Women's League (Liga Kobiet Polskich), founded 1913.

Russia
League for Women's Equality (Всероссийская лига равноправия женщин), 1907–1917
Union for Women's Equality (Всероссийский союз равноправия женщин), 1905–1917

Spain

Asociación Nacional de Mujeres Españolas  –  Spanish organization from 1918 to 1936

Sweden
Fredrika Bremer Association (Fredrika Bremer Förbundet), founded 1884
Gothenburg's Women's Association (Göteborgs Kvinnoförening), 1884–1891
National Association for Women's Suffrage (Landsföreningen för kvinnans politiska rösträtt) – Swedish organization from 1902 to 1921

Switzerland
Association internationale des femmes (International Association of Women), Geneva, 1868–1872

United Kingdom

National Union of Women's Suffrage Societies – a major United Kingdom organization.
Women's Social and Political Union – a major suffrage organization in United Kingdom (breakaway from the National Union for Women's Suffrage).
Women's Freedom League
Men's League for Women's Suffrage
Northern Men's League for Women's Suffrage
Edinburgh National Society for Women's Suffrage
Glasgow and West of Scotland Association for Women's Suffrage
Actresses' Franchise League

United States

Alpha Suffrage Club – believed to be the first black women's suffrage association in the United States, it began in Chicago, Illinois in 1913 under the initiative of Ida B. Wells-Barnett and Belle Squire.
American Equal Rights Association – from 1866 to 1869, early attempt at a national organization by Lucy Stone, Susan B. Anthony and others.
American Woman Suffrage Association – American suffrage organization formed in 1869 by Lucy Stone and Antoinette Brown Blackwell after a split in the American Equal Rights Association. It joined the National American Woman Suffrage Association (NAWSA) in 1890.
College Equal Suffrage League – U.S. group founded in 1900 by Maud Wood Park and Inez Haynes Irwin to attract younger women to the movement. Merged with NAWSA in 1908.
Congressional Union – radical U.S. organization formed in 1913 to campaign for a constitutional amendment for women's voting rights. Led by Alice Paul and Lucy Burns, In 1915 changed its name to National Woman's Party.
Equal Franchise Society – created and joined by American women of wealth, a politically active organization conducted within a socially comfortable milieu.
Leslie Woman Suffrage Commission, formed by Carrie Chapman Catt in March 1917 using funds willed for the purpose by Miriam Leslie. The Commission, based in New York City, promoted woman's suffrage by educating the public and was affiliated with NAWSA.
The Men's League, formed by Oswald Garrison Villard with Max Eastman. Also known as the Men's Equal Suffrage League, Men's League for Woman Suffrage and the National Men's League for Woman Suffrage.
National American Woman Suffrage Association (NAWSA) – formed in 1890 by the joining of the American Woman Suffrage Association and the National Woman Suffrage Association.
National Woman's Party – major United States organization founded in 1915 by Alice Paul and Lucy Burns to campaign for a constitutional amendment. Organized the Silent Sentinels. From 1913–1915 the same core group's name was the Congressional Union.
National Women's Rights Convention – a series of major U.S. organizing conventions, held from 1850 to 1869.
National Woman Suffrage Association – American organization founded in 1869 by Susan B. Anthony and Elizabeth Cady Stanton after the split in the American Equal Rights Association, joined NAWSA in 1890.
New England Woman Suffrage Association (NEWSA) – formed in 1868 as the first major political organization with women's suffrage as its goal, active until 1920, principal leaders were Julia Ward Howe and Lucy Stone, played key role in forming the American Woman Suffrage Association.
Silent Sentinels – Members of the National Woman's Party who picketed America's White House from January 1917 to June 1919 during Woodrow Wilson's presidency and until the 19th Amendment was passed, initiated and led by Alice Paul.
Women's Trade Union League – American organization formed in 1903, later involved with the campaign for the 19th amendment.

Massachusetts

Boston Equal Suffrage Association for Good Government – an American organization devoted to women's suffrage in Massachusetts, it was active from 1901 to 1920. 

New York

Woman Suffrage Party – inclusive New York suffrage party founded by Carrie Chapman Catt.

Women's suffrage publications

Nineteenth Amendment to the United States Constitution – drafted by Susan B. Anthony and Elizabeth Cady Stanton in 1878, ratified in 1920
Declaration of Sentiments – major statement for women's rights, including the right to vote, passed and signed at the Seneca Falls Convention in 1848. Mainly written by Elizabeth Cady Stanton.
History of Woman Suffrage – six books produced from 1881 to 1922 by Elizabeth Cady Stanton, Susan B. Anthony, Matilda Joslyn Gage and Ida Husted Harper.
Jus Suffragii was the official journal of the International Woman Suffrage Alliance, published monthly from 1906 to 1924.
Suffrage Atelier – publishing collective in England, founded 1909.
The Freewoman, a feminist weekly which, among other topics, covered the suffrage movement, was published between November 1911 and October 1912 and edited by Dora Marsden and Mary Gawthorpe. 
The Liberator – weekly newspaper published by William Lloyd Garrison which, although primarily supporting abolition of slavery, also took up the suffrage cause from 1838 until it closed in 1865.
The Revolution – weekly U.S. newspaper, 1868–1872. Official publication of the National Woman Suffrage Association.
Suffragette Sally – a 1911 suffrage novel by Gertrude Colmore.
The Una – 1853 paper devoted to the enfranchisement of woman, owned and edited by Paulina Wright Davis, and first published in Providence, Rhode Island. The Una was the first paper focused on woman suffrage, and the first distinctively woman's rights journal. 
The Vote – Publication of British Women's Freedom League.
Woodhull & Claflin's Weekly – weekly publication founded by Victoria Woodhull and Tennessee Claflin, 1870–1876.
The Woman Voter – Publication of the New York Woman Suffrage Party.
Woman's Journal and Suffrage News – major weekly newspaper founded by Lucy Stone and Henry Blackwell in 1870, eventually absorbed other suffrage publications
Women's Suffrage Journal – magazine published from 1870–1890 in the United Kingdom.

Belgium: publications
Ligue belge du droit des femmes (1892–1914)

Denmark: publications
Kvinden & Samfundet (Woman & Society), founded 1885 by the Danish Women's Society.

Russia: publications
Women's Union (Союз женщин), published by the Union for Women's Equality, 1907–1909.

Sweden: publications
Dagny, 1886–1914
Hertha, 1914–1990s

See also
 List of suffragists and suffragettes
 Timeline of women's suffrage
 Timeline of first women's suffrage in majority-Muslim countries
 Women's suffrage in Australia
 Women's suffrage in Japan
 Women's suffrage in New Zealand
 Women's suffrage in the United Kingdom
 Women's suffrage in the United States
 Open Christmas Letter
 Seneca Falls Convention
 Suffrage Hikes

References